Monte Cater (born July 7, 1949) is a former American football coach. From 1987 to 2017, he was the head football coach at Shepherd University in Shepherdstown, West Virginia.  From 1981 to 1986, Cater was the head football coach at Lakeland College in Sheboygan, Wisconsin.

Coaching career
Cater was made the 12th head coach of the Shepherd University Rams football team on February 9, 1987 and also served as the college's athletic director from 1993 to 2004. He is Shepherd College's and the West Virginia Intercollegiate Athletic Conference's all-time winningest coach.  He has been awarded the WVIAC Coach of the Year Award seven times, The Journal Coach of the Year Award and has won the WVIAC conference title 12 times.

He was named the Mountain East Conference Coach of the Year in 2013.

Before coming to Shepherd, Cater was the head coach of Lakeland College from 1980 to 1986 and is credited with reviving the college's football program, winning the Illini-Badger Football Conference title three times. He currently resides in Martinsburg, West Virginia with his wife, Bonnie, and their two children, Taylor and Logan.

On December 5, 2015 with a win over Slippery Rock in the Super 1 Region Final, Cater achieved his 250th victory as a college football coach. 

On January 24, 2018 Cater announced his retirement after 31 seasons at Shepherd. He was replaced by longtime assistant Ernie McCook. Cater had been the active wins leader in all levels of college football with 274 career victories.

Head coaching record

See also
 List of college football coaches with 200 wins

References

External links
 Shepherd profile

1949 births
Living people
Lakeland Muskies football coaches
Millikin Big Blue football coaches
Shepherd Rams football coaches
Southern Illinois University Carbondale alumni
People from Shepherdstown, West Virginia
People from Shelbyville, Illinois